Saudi Arabia is a sovereign Arab state in Western Asia constituting the bulk of the Arabian Peninsula. The country's command economy is petroleum-based but slowly diversifying; in 2017 58% of budget revenues and 85% of export earnings came from the oil industry. The country plans to reduce oil-based revenues to 42% by 2023. A considerable proportion of Saudi companies are owned by families, including the royal family.

Public companies are listed on the Tadawul. For further information on the types of business entities in this country and their abbreviations, see "Business entities in Saudi Arabia".

Largest firms 

This list shows firms in the Fortune Global 500, which ranks firms by total revenues reported before 31 March 2017. Only the top five firms (if available) are included as a sample.

Notable firms 
This list includes notable companies with primary headquarters located in the country. The industry and sector follow the Industry Classification Benchmark taxonomy. Organizations which have ceased operations are included and noted as defunct.

See also 

 List of banks in Saudi Arabia
 List of newspapers in Saudi Arabia
 Media of Saudi Arabia
 List of largest companies in Saudi Arabia

References 

 
 
Saudi Arabia